Robert Hatem (Arabic: روبير حاتم, born ), known by his code name Cobra, (named after his personal pistol), is a Lebanese former bodyguard and head of security of the Lebanese Forces leader Elie Hobeika, and who later moved to France as a political refugee where he published his scandalous book From Israel to Damascus.  His book caused so much controversy within the Lebanese political realm to the point it was banned from being published and distributed in Lebanon. The book focuses on Hobeika’s role as a militia leader during the civil war, including corruption and his role in the Sabra and Shatila operation.

Biography
From an early age, Hatem was involved in military trainings in the Lebanese Front and the Kataeb party.

in 1972, he moved to Israel to receive training and later became the personal assistant of Elie Hobeika (HK) for 20 years.

Cobra moved to France as an asylee, where he wrote his book From Israel to Damascus, which some believe that he released to protect himself from the risk of political assassination because he knew so much sensitive information about HK, who was later assassinated. In 1999 a Lebanese daily, Al Bayrak, published an interview with Hatem which led to the prosecution of the paper's directors, Melhem Karam and Said Nasreddine.

He is believed to be in Paris.

See also 

 Boutros Khawand
 Elias Khoury
 Hanna Atik (a.k.a. 'Hanoun')
 Jocelyne Khoueiry
 Massoud Achkar (a.k.a. 'Poussy' Achkar)

References 

Refugees in France
Living people
1950s births
Kataeb Party
Lebanese non-fiction writers